Michael Phelps (born October 3, 1961) is an American former professional basketball player. Born in Vicksburg, Mississippi, he attended Alcorn State University and was selected in the 7th round of the 1985 NBA draft by the Seattle SuperSonics. Phelps played with the Sonics and Los Angeles Clippers. He later took his talents overseas and found success in the Philippine Basketball Association where he played for the San Miguel Beermen, helping them win two conference championships in 1988 and 1989. The latter became the first of three consecutive conference titles the team will win that year to accomplish the Grand Slam title run becoming only the second team in the league to do so.  Phelps played one more conference with the team in 1990 but they failed to qualify for the semi-finals.

References

External links
NBA stats @ basketballreference.com

1961 births
Living people
Alcorn State Braves basketball players
American expatriate basketball people in the Philippines
American men's basketball players
Basketball players from Mississippi
Los Angeles Clippers players
Pensacola Tornados (1986–1991) players
Philippine Basketball Association imports
San Miguel Beermen players
Santa Barbara Islanders players
Seattle SuperSonics draft picks
Seattle SuperSonics players
Shooting guards
Sportspeople from Vicksburg, Mississippi
Wyoming Wildcatters players